The Hanshin Kobe Kosoku Line (阪神神戸高速線 Hanshin Kōbe Kōsoku sen) is one of three lines of the Kobe Rapid Transit Railway, operated by Hanshin Railway and Hankyu Railway.  Trains from Hanshin, Hankyu and Sanyo railways enter this line.

Since the Tozai Line connects three lines, it has three termini: Nishidai in the west, Hankyu Sannomiya and Motomachi in the east. All three were opened in 1968. Tracks from the three termini meet at Kosoku-Kobe. Unlike the Namboku Line, it has standard gauge tracks, .

Stations served 

 Legend
 ● : Stops
 ∥ :  Does not run through here

References 
This article incorporates material from the corresponding article in the Japanese Wikipedia

Railway lines in Japan
Standard gauge railways in Japan
Lines of Hanshin Electric Railway
Hankyu Railway lines
Railway lines opened in 1968